BBC Gardeners' World Live (GWL) is a large multi-day gardening related consumer show held each June at the National Exhibition Centre, England, co-located with the BBC Good Food Show Summer. Open to the general public, the BBC television programme endorsed event typically hosts celebrity focus groups and advice workshops, showcases new product announcements, show gardens, floral marquee, along with providing retail space to exhibiting parties. Exhibitors have included Thompson & Morgan, Makita tools and many more.

History 
The first GWL was held in June 1992. It was a spinoff from the BBC Gardeners' World television series. The event had 17,500 attendees and over 100 exhibitors. Since 2005 GWL has been co-located with the BBC Good Food Show Summer. Until 2015, GWL included RHS Flower Show Birmingham, but after the 2015 Show GWL and RHS parted ways. BBC Gardeners' World Live continues to be one of the country's leading gardening events.

Recent years
The show attracts an audience of between 90,000 and 100,000 annually. The Audit Bureau of Circulations confirmed the 2010 show's attendance at 101,005. With 564 participating companies between 16–20 June 2010. In celebration of her 60th birthday formal model and socialite Twiggy was the honorary recipient of a named rose. Tickets are sold via the NEC's box office, The Ticket Factory. In 2017 the event celebrated 50 years of BBC Two's Gardeners' World.

Show highlights 

The 2017 Show included features celebrating the 50th anniversary of BBC Two's Gardeners' World including The Nostalgia Garden set in the 60s (designed by Paul Stone), and The Anniversary Garden showing vignettes of how the garden design styles have developed over the decades (designed by Professor David Stevens). The BBC Two production team filmed at the event on Wednesday (before opening to the public) and Thursday, with the resulting 1-hour anniversary TV special airing on Friday 17 June. Best in Show was won by Wyevale Garden Centres for their 'Romance in the Ruins' garden designed by Claudia de Yong.

In 2016 the show includes Floral Marquee, Show Gardens and BBC Gardeners' World Live Theatre where the TV presenters shared their inspiration live on stage, along with Alan Titchmarsh on Friday.

In 2013 the show included the RHS Floral Marquee, BBC Gardeners' World Theatre, The Kitchen Garden Stage, The Design Clinic, Gardening for Wildlife and Show Gardens. For the first time the outside area was brought together under the banner RHS Flower Show Birmingham. Celebrity and expert gardeners included Monty Don, Carol Klein, Joe Swift, Diarmuid Gavin, Cleve West, Toby Buckland, Anne Swithinbank, Matt Biggs and David Domoney.

In previous years the shows featured the Gardeners' World Magazine Theatre, award winning show gardens, grow your own garden, Floral Marquee and Floristry Master-classes.

Celebrity guests are commonplace with familiar names such as Toby Buckland, Monty Don, Joe Swift, John Craven, Julia Bradbury, James Martin, Ainsley Harriott and the Hairy Bikers.

Each year prizes for best gardens are bestowed upon exhibitors by visiting celebrities attracting large media attention.

Rose Dedications - every year a new breed of rose is specifically dedicated and named after a leading public figure. Previous recipients include Phillip Schofield, Barbara Windsor and Twiggy. In 2017 the new rose 'Gardeners' Gold' was launched.

Sponsors

In recent years, sponsors involved in the Show include
 Lexus: Headline sponsors in 2014, 2015, 2016, 2017
 Wyevale Garden Centres: sponsors in 2015, 2016, 2017
 GreenThumb; Floral Marquee sponsors in 2016
 Honda
 Thompson & Morgan

Show Dates 

 The 2006 show ran from 14–18 June
 The 2007 show ran from 16–20 June
 The 2008 show ran from 11–15 June
 The 2009 show ran from 10–14 June
 The 2010 show ran from 16–20 June
 The 2011 show ran from 15–19 June
 The 2012 show ran from 13–17 June
 The 2013 show ran from 12–16 June
 The 2014 show ran from 12–15 June
 The 2015 show ran from 11–14 June
 The 2016 show ran from 16–19 June
 The 2017 show ran from 15–18 June
 The 2018 show ran from 14–17 June
 The 2019 show ran from 13–16 June
 The 2020 show was cancelled due to the COVID-19 pandemic
 The 2021 show is scheduled for 17–21 June, subject to COVID-19 lockdown restrictions being lifted

See also 

 Royal Horticultural Society
 Chelsea Flower Show
 Tatton Park Flower Show

References

External links 

 

Horticultural exhibitions
Gardening in the United Kingdom
Tourist attractions in the West Midlands (county)
Exhibitions in the United Kingdom
Annual events in the United Kingdom
1991 establishments in the United Kingdom
Recurring events established in 1991
BBC events